High Jinx is a 1986 Blackford Oakes novel by William F. Buckley, Jr. It is the seventh of 11 novels in the series by date of publication, but occurs third chronologically.

Plot
CIA agent Blackford Oakes is sent inside the Soviet Union to monitor an internal power struggle within the Kremlin in 1954.

References

1986 American novels
Blackford Oakes novels
Fiction set in 1954
Novels set in Russia
English-language novels